Camille Bière (13 September 1889 – 31 July 1969) was a French racing cyclist. He rode in the 1926 Tour de France.

References

1889 births
1969 deaths
French male cyclists
Place of birth missing